Hölder is a German surname. Notable people with the surname include:

 Otto Hölder (1859–1937), German mathematician
 Ernst Hölder (1901−1990), German mathematician, son of Otto

See also
 Holder (surname)

German-language surnames